UCWeb Inc. (also known as UC Mobile) is a Chinese mobile Internet company that offers products and services including mobile browser, UC News, and search. Its flagship product, UC Browser, topped the Chinese, Indonesian and Indian markets in 2013.

Description 

UCWeb was founded in 2004 as a mobile browser maker; over the past decade it expanded to diversified areas such as mobile search, mobile gaming, mobile reading, etc. The company's UC Browser is the most popular of its kind in China with more than 66% market share, according to market researcher iResearch. It's also the No. 1 browser in India with upwards of 34% market share, via StatCounter. It's available in 11 languages (English, Hindi, Russian, Indonesian, Vietnamese, etc.) and on all major mobile OS platform (iOS, Android, Windows Phone, Java ME, Blackberry, etc.). The browser prides itself in fast pageload and economic data consumption made available by its data compression technology and a cloud system. UC Browser has over 500 million users around the globe, as of March 2014.

In April 2014, UCWeb and Alibaba Group jointly announced the formation of a JV named Shenma Inc. that offers a mobile-only search engine in China.

In June 2014, UCWeb was acquired by Alibaba Group in the largest Chinese Internet merger deal  through which UCWeb will form the Alibaba UC mobile business group by assimilating and consolidating part of mobile-related businesses within the Alibaba Group. After the merger, under the leadership of Yu Yongfu, chief executive of UCWeb since 2006, the Alibaba UC mobile business group will oversee the browser, search, location-based service, app store, mobile gaming, and mobile reader operations.

In 2015 it was revealed as part of the Snowden leaks that UCBrowser leaks sensitive IMSI, IMEI and MSISDN data, which was used by intelligence agencies to track users.

References

Alibaba Group
Internet search engines
Software companies of China
Companies based in Beijing
Companies based in Guangzhou
Chinese companies established in 2004
Internet technology companies of China
Software companies based in Beijing
Chinese brands
2014 mergers and acquisitions